Vedulphus was a Pre-congregational saint and Bishop of Arras, France from 545AD.

He succeeded Bishop Domenico in 545AD, and when he died in 580AD the diocese of Arras was suppressed to establish Diocese of Cambrai. His feast day is 6 February.

References

Bishops of Arras
Roman Catholic monks
5th-century births
6th-century Frankish saints
Year of birth unknown
Year of death unknown